Bhesa paniculata is a species of plant in the Centroplacaceae family. It is found in India, Indonesia, Malaysia, the Philippines, Singapore, and Thailand. It is sometimes considered a synonym of Bhesa indica.

References

paniculata
Least concern plants
Taxonomy articles created by Polbot